The 1998 Latvian Individual Speedway Championship was the 24th Latvian Individual Speedway Championship season. The final took place on 16 August 1998 in Daugavpils, Latvia.

Results
 August 16, 1998
  Daugavpils

Speedway in Latvia
1998 in Latvian sport
1998 in speedway